Mikhaylov is a rural locality (a khutor) in Zarevskoye Rural Settlement of Shovgenovsky District, the Republic of Adygea, Russia. The population reported was 76 as of 2018. There are 3 streets.

Geography 
Mikhaylov is located 11 km southwest of Khakurinokhabl (the district's administrative centre) by road. Zadunayevsky is the nearest rural locality.

References 

Rural localities in Shovgenovsky District